John Samels, better known by his stage name Paper Tiger, is a hip hop producer and DJ from Minneapolis, Minnesota, who is currently based in Brooklyn, New York. He is a founding member of the indie hip hop collective Doomtree.

History
Paper Tiger released the 7-inch vinyl single, Cloquet, in December 2009.

His first solo album, Made Like Us, was released in July 2010. It features vocal contributions from Dessa of Doomtree and Maggie Morrison of Digitata. Chris Riemenschneider of Star Tribune described the album as "a moody, sometimes dark but also surprisingly elegant and cinematic collection, recalling DJ Shadow's best stuff."

He released Summer EP in August 2012 and Beat Tape the next month. Prefix premiered the track "Gold Pass" and 89.3 The Current premiered a video for the track "The Fortunate Wayfarer."

In 2016, Paper Tiger released In Other Words Part One in April and In Other Words Part Two in July, with each containing four songs. It features vocals from Dessa and Aby Wolf.

Samels is also a founding member of the Doomtree project SHREDDERS, as well as Cloquet, an indie electronic music project with J.Gundersen.

In addition to artistic music output Samels creates the original music score for film and television including the HBO documentary Rock and a Hard Place.

Besides producing, Samels also works as a Designer / Art Director in Brooklyn, New York.

Discography

Studio albums
 Made Like Us (2010)
 In Other Words (Album) (2017)
 Shredders (Dangerous Jumps) (2018)
 Cloquet (Self Titled) (2018)
 Shredders (Great Hits) (2019)

EPs
 False Hopes 11: Paper Tiger (2007)
 Summer EP (2012)
 Beat Tape (2012)
 In Other Words Part One (2016) 
 In Other Words Part Two (2016)
 In Other Words Part Three (2017)

Singles
 Cloquet (2009)

Mixtapes
 Doomtree Standards Mixtape (2010)

Productions
 Dessa - "551" from False Hopes (2005)
 Sims - "Dreamsleep" and "No Homeowners" from Lights Out Paris (2005)
 P.O.S - "Low Light Low Life" from Never Better (2009)
 Sims - "Pay No Mind Redo" from False Hopes XIV (2009)
 Dessa - "The Chaconne," "Go Home," "The Bullpen," "Crew," and "Alibi" from A Badly Broken Code (2010)
 Mike Mictlan - "Dwnsze" from Snaxxx (2012)
 F.Stokes - Fearless Beauty (2013)
 Dessa - "Warsaw", "Call Off Your Ghost", and "The Lamb" from Parts of Speech (2013)
 F. Stokes - "Can't Call It" and "Summer Coldest" from Liquor Sto' Diaries (2014)
 Sims - "A Bad Flying Bird", "Icarus", "Flash Paper", and "Gosper Island" from More Than Ever (2016)

Remixes
 Poliça - "Chain My Name (Paper Tiger Remix)" (2013)
 Astronautalis - "Dimitri Mendeleev (Paper Tiger remix)" (2014)
 GAYNGS - "COLOGNE & WATER (PAPER TIGER REGRIND)" (2011)
 Mike Mictlan - "Prizefight (Paper Tiger Remix)" (2009)
 Sun Gods to Gamma Rays - "You Thought You Had It All (Paper Tiger Remix)" (2014)
 J.Gundersen - "Balcony (Paper Tiger Remix)" (2014)

References

External links
 
 DESK2
 Paper Tiger on Bandcamp
 Paper Tiger on Doomtree

Doomtree members
American hip hop record producers
American DJs
Musicians from Minneapolis
Living people
Year of birth missing (living people)
Hopkins High School alumni